Washington Township is a township in Lawrence County, Pennsylvania, United States. The population was 710 at the time of the 2020 census, a decline  from the figure of 799 tabulated in 2010.

Geography
According to the United States Census Bureau, the township has a total area of 16.6 square miles (43.0 km2), of which 16.4 square miles (42.5 km2) is land and 0.2 square miles (0.5 km2), or 1.26%, is water.

Demographics
As of the census of 2000, there were 714 people, 259 households, and 205 families residing in the township.

The population density was 43.5 people per square mile (16.8/km2). There were 289 housing units at an average density of 17.6/sq mi (6.8/km2). The racial makeup of the township was 99.86% White and 0.14% Asian. Hispanic or Latino of any race were 0.07% of the population.

There were 259 households, out of which 34.7% had children under the age of eighteen living with them; 66.4% were married couples living together, 10.4% had a female householder with no husband present, and 20.8% were non-families. 18.5% of all households were made up of individuals, and 7.3% had someone living alone who was sixty-five years of age or older.

The average household size was 2.76 and the average family size was 3.15.

In the township the population was spread out, with 26.1% under the age of eighteen, 8.5% from eighteen to twenty-four, 28.2% from twenty-five to forty-four, 27.6% from forty-five to sixty-four, and 9.7% who were sixty-five years of age or older. The median age was thirty-eight years.

For every one hundred females there were 105.8 males. For every one hundred females who were aged eighteen or older, there were 106.3 males.

The median income for a household in the township was $38,365, and the median income for a family was $41,705. Males had a median income of $35,167 compared with that of $21,429 for females.

The per capita income for the township was $16,270.

Roughly 9.3% of families and 9.7% of the population were living below the poverty line, including 12.6% of those who were under the age of eighteen and 2.5% of those who were aged sixty-five or older.

References

Populated places established in 1797
Townships in Lawrence County, Pennsylvania